Çobandede Bridge (also called Çoban Bridge) is a historical bridge in Erzurum Province of Turkey.

Location
Köprüköy, literally "bridge Ville" is named after the bridge. The bridge is situated at the point where two tributaries of the Aras River meet. It is on the road from Erzurum to Muş.

History
In 1865 a priest, Archimandrite Timeteos, copied an inscription, in Armenian that was on the bridge. It read "this bridge, founded by the Armenians, was repaired by the Magistros under the auspices of the monastery of Sourb Astvatzatzin and the castle of Darun in the year 609" (609 is equivalent to the year 1160). In 1904, Kajberuny saw this inscription, and two others in Arabic, saying that they were located above the arches on the eastern side of the bridge. Neither the Armenian inscription nor the two Arabic inscriptions currently survive on the bridge. A fourth inscription, not seen by Kajberuny, in Arabic, still survives but in a worn and damaged condition. It is located on the bridge's parapet. About the "Magistros" mentioned in the inscription, Kortoshian writes that it may be the family title used by descendants of Grigor Magistros. He was buried in Sourb Astvatzatzin monastery close to nearby Pasinler (Hasankale); Darun (Daroynk) has been identified as either Hasankale or Dogubayazit.
Turkish researchers write it was constructed during the Mongol occupation of Anatolia towards the end of the 13th century. According to one view, up to 1271 flood, there was an ancient bridge near Çobandede Bridge. Thus Çobandedde Bridge was constructed later than 1271. In a barely readable part of the inscription, there is a date that corresponds to 1289. This date is in accordance with the name of the bridge. Because towards the conclusion of the 13th century, Ilkhanid authority in Anatolia was represented by Mongol general Chupan (called Emir Çoban in Turkish).

The bridge was restored in 1727, and again in 1872. In 1946-48 it was additionally restored by the Turkish army.

Technical details
The building material is cut stone with three different colors (black, red and, gray). In the original design, the bridge had seven arches. But one of the arches is now buried underground. There are eight chambers in the abutments.

References

Arch bridges in Turkey
Buildings and structures in Erzincan Province
Bridges completed in the 13th century